Alarobia Bemaha is a town and commune in Madagascar. It belongs to the district of Betafo, which is a part of Vakinankaratra region. The population of the commune was estimated to be approximately 15,000 in 2001 commune census.

Only primary schooling is available. The majority 85% of the population of the commune are farmers, while an additional 15% receives their livelihood from raising livestock. The most important crops are maize and ginger, while other important agricultural products are beans and rice.

References and notes 

Populated places in Vakinankaratra